The Police Council was a national United Kingdom body for discussing police pensions, pay and service conditions.

It was formed in 1920, with Dorothy Peto joining as its first female member in 1931. It was abolished in 1978, with its functions taken over two years later by the Police Negotiating Board.

References

History of law enforcement in the United Kingdom
1920 establishments in the United Kingdom
1978 disestablishments in the United Kingdom